Giuseppe "Beppe" Tosi (25 May 1916 – 10 July 1981) was an Italian discus thrower. He won silver medal at the 1946, 1950 and 1954 European championships and 1948 Olympics, every time beaten by the teammate Adolfo Consolini. At the 1952 Olympics Tosi placed eighth and Consolini second.

Biography
Tosi won five national titles, in 1943, 1946–1948 and 1951, and set two European records, both in 1948. Near the end of his athletic career, similar to Consolini, he went into acting and played minute roles in several major films, including Totò al giro d'Italia (1948), Quo Vadis (1951), The Return of Don Camillo (1953), Ben-Hur (1959) and The Lovemakers (1961).

Achievements

Filmography

References

External links
 
 

1916 births
1981 deaths
Italian male discus throwers
Olympic silver medalists for Italy
Athletes (track and field) at the 1948 Summer Olympics
Athletes (track and field) at the 1952 Summer Olympics
Olympic athletes of Italy
European Athletics Championships medalists
Medalists at the 1948 Summer Olympics
Olympic silver medalists in athletics (track and field)
Mediterranean Games gold medalists for Italy
Athletes (track and field) at the 1951 Mediterranean Games
Mediterranean Games medalists in athletics
20th-century Italian people